WOPG (1460 kHz) is an AM radio station licensed to Albany, New York and serving the Capital District. It is owned by Pax et Bonum, Inc. (Peace and Goodness in Latin) and has a Christian radio format aimed at Roman Catholic listeners, with much of its programming coming from the EWTN Radio network. WOPG simulcasts with WOPG-FM at 89.9 FM in Esperance, New York.

WOPG was the first radio station licensed to Albany. It operates with 5,000 watts of power non-directional by day, and employs a directional antenna at night to protect other stations on AM 1460. The transmitter site is on Kenwood Avenue in Delmar, New York.

History

According to FCC records, WOPG only dates back to 1947, the year when it was authorized, as WOKO, to replace an earlier station, also WOKO, whose license had been revoked. However, most station histories consider the 1947 authorization to be a direct continuation of the earlier WOKO, which dated to 1924.

Establishment in New York City

The original WOKO was first licensed, with the sequentially issued call letters WDBX, in June 1924 to Otto Baur at 138 Dyckman Street in New York City. The initial authorization was for only 5 watts transmitting on 1290 kHz, and the station referred to itself as "New York's Smallest Radio Station". In 1925 WDBX's power was increased to 50 watts, and its call sign changed to WOKO.

In mid-1926 the station was purchased by Harold E. Smith and moved north of New York City to Peekskill. In early 1928 the station made a move further north, setting up the station's transmitter on Mount Beacon in southern Dutchess County and serving Poughkeepsie and Newburgh from the Hotel Windsor in Poughkeepsie. WOKO was billed as "The Voice from the Clouds" for its transmitter site on one of the highest mountains in the Hudson Valley. On November 11, 1928, under the provisions of the Federal Radio Commission's General Order 40, WOKO was assigned to 1440 kHz.

The Newburgh-Poukeepsie area of the Hudson Valley was still largely undeveloped, with few advertising opportunities. Without a network affiliation, and limited nighttime hours due to having to share its frequency with WHEC-WABO (now WHIC) in Rochester, the station was unprofitable. In late 1929 Harold E. Smith contacted Sam Pickard, vice president in charge of station relations for the Columbia Broadcasting System (CBS) radio network, to see if WOKO could become a CBS affiliate. Pickard determined that currently the station was not qualified, however, it would be if it were to move to Albany and expand its hours of operation.

Move to Albany

WOKO received approval from the Federal Radio Commission (FRC) to make the changes suggested by Pickard, and on April 17, 1931 was authorized to begin broadcasting full-time from Albany on 1430 kHz. It was the first radio station licensed to New York's state capital, although WGY had been broadcasting from nearby Schenectady since 1922. The station became profitable, due to its expanded hours of operation, combined with the ability to carry CBS's dramas, comedies, news, sports, soap operas, game shows and big band broadcasts during the "Golden Age of Radio." With the implementation of the North American Regional Broadcasting Agreement in March 1941, stations on 1430 kHz, including WOKO, shifted to 1460 kHz, its assignment ever since.

License revocation and reassignment

WOKO's license came up for its periodic renewal on October 1, 1942. However, as part of the proceedings the Federal Communications Commission (FCC) launched an investigation into whether the station owner, WOKO, Inc., was no longer qualified to be a licensee, because it had repeatedly been deceptive in fully disclosing the company's stockholders. It was eventually determined that, in return for his aid in the station acquiring the CBS network affiliation, Sam Pickard had received control of 240 shares of the company's 1,000 shares of stock, although WOKO's financial reports to the FRC and the FCC in the subsequent twelve years had concealed this information. In 1943 Sam Pickard's wife, Francke, attempted to dispose of the 240 shares for $75,000, but the FCC blocked the sale. On March 27, 1945, the Commission "concluded that the applicant cannot be entrusted with the responsibilities of a licensee" and denied renewal of WOKO's license.

This ruling was appealed to the United States Court of Appeals for the District of Columbia, which reversed the FCC's decision on the grounds that "The denial of renewal because of the applicant's failure to show the beneficial ownership of twenty-four per cent of its capital cannot be justified as a penalty for making false statements." However, on subsequent appeal the Supreme Court reversed the Appeals Court decision, and ruled on December 9, 1946 that FCC's deletion of WOKO was appropriate.

At this time WOKO was one of only two stations licensed to Albany, so to limit the disruption of the station going silent the FCC issued a series of temporary authorizations allowing it to continue broadcasting until its successor was operational. A hearing was held reviewing three competing applications for WOKO's replacement, and on October 21, 1947 the FCC chose the Governor Dongan Broadcasting Corporation. Although technically this was a new station unrelated to the original WOKO, the fact that the new station inherited the WOKO call sign and frequency meant that functionally it was a continuation of its predecessor.

As of January 1, 1947 WOKO's CBS affiliation had been lost to upstart WTRY (now WOFX) in Troy, and WOKO evolved into a locally based format independent of any network, consisting largely of music, a rarity in a medium market in that era. The station also carried Brooklyn Dodgers baseball games in the 1950s before the team's move to Los Angeles. In the 1950s and early 60s, WOKO aired a full service, middle of the road format of popular music, news and sports. In an opening paragraph of Ian Fleming's 1962 novel The Spy Who Loved Me, protagonist Vivienne Michel travels to central New York state and recounts listening to WOKO, with the parenthetical comment "they might have dreamed up a grander callsign!".

Country music
In the late 1960s, WOKO decided to go after an audience that was not well-served in the Capital District.  Under station manager Charles Murn, WOKO flipped to country music. Charlie Heisler was the Chief Engineer. In the early 1960s, WOKO's lineup was led by Geoff Davis (formerly of WROW-Albany and WINS-New York City). Bob Cathcart, from Hoosick Falls, was the News Anchor.

The station's country format lasted until 1978 after competition from FM rival 107.7 WGNA-FM led WOKO to change formats.  For a short time it tried disco music. Coming into the format right after the peak of the disco fad and having to battle two decades of country heritage, the new format failed.  In early 1980, WOKO returned to country. Though initially regaining some audience, the flip of the more powerful 1540 WPTR to country later that year wiped away any gains the station had made.

All News and Oldies
On August 23, 1982, WOKO ended its second attempt at country by flipping to an all-news radio format, carrying the audio from CNN Headline News (then CNN2) most of the day with sports from the Enterprise Radio Network at night. With this flip came the new call sign: WWCN, with the last two letters standing for CNN. Though low in overhead, the new station also retained the low ratings of the previous format and soon added some talk programming. WWCN continued to struggle and left the format in early 1987.

The demise of WWCN led to the return of the WOKO call letters, this time running an oldies format and converting to C-QUAM AM stereo (only the second station in the market, behind WPTR, to do so). This format was short lived.

WOKO was purchased by Barnstable Broadcasting, then owners of WGNA-FM, with the sale closing in late 1988.  Barnstable then took WOKO to a WGNA simulcast most of the day.  It did air some separate special programming and Albany-Colonie Yankees games, when not carrying country music programming.  The AM station switched its call sign to WGNA while the FM station became WGNA-FM.  This arrangement would last for over a decade through several owners.  Regent Communications acquired WGNA-AM-FM in 2000, and the 1460 frequency was put up for sale.

Radio Disney
In March 2002, Regent sold the station to the Walt Disney Company, who had converted it to the Radio Disney children's radio format on February 28, 2002.  It was the only Disney-owned outlet in Upstate New York, although a local owner in the Syracuse area converted one of his AM stations to Radio Disney as well.

The call letters for 1460 were then changed to WDDY. The Disney format lasted more than a decade.  But in June 2013, Disney put WDDY and six other Disney stations in medium-sized radio markets up for sale, in order to refocus the network's broadcast distribution on Top-25 markets.  On September 29, 2013, WDDY dropped the Radio Disney programming and went dark.

Catholic Radio
In October, Disney filed to sell WDDY to Pax et Bonum, owner of 89.9 WOPG-FM in Esperance. The acquisition was made to improve the signal for Catholic Radio in the Capital District.  Pax et Bonum converted the station to noncommercial operation as a simulcast of WOPG-FM's Catholic radio programming, from studios at the AM station's Delmar transmitter site. The sale was consummated on January 17, 2014, the station resumed operations on January 29, 2014, and its call sign was changed to WOPG on February 27, 2014.

References

External links 

FCC History Cards for WOPG (covering WOKO from its reauthorization in 1947 to 1981)

OPG (AM)
Radio stations established in 1924
1924 establishments in New York City
Catholic radio stations
Former subsidiaries of The Walt Disney Company
OPG (AM)